The following is the complete list of performances by American media personality Kim Kardashian.

Film

Television

As herself

As actress

As executive producer

Music videos

Video games

Discography

References

External links
 

Performances
Kardashian, Kim
Kardashian, Kim